Mendelssohn is a crater on Mercury.  Its name was adopted by the International Astronomical Union (IAU) on April 24, 2012.  Mendelssohn is named for the German composer Jakob Ludwig Felix Mendelssohn.

The floor of Mendelssohn is covered by smooth plains materials which are created by extrusive volcanism.

A confirmed dark spot is present in north-central Mendelssohn, around a crater of 19 km diameter.  The crater excavated low reflectance material (LRM).  Hollows are present within the crater.

On the east rim of Mendelssohn is the crater Berry.

References

Impact craters on Mercury